Calumma malthe , common name Malthe's green-eared chameleon is a species of chameleon found in Madagascar.

References

malthe
Endemic fauna of Madagascar
Reptiles of Madagascar
Reptiles described in 1879
Taxa named by Albert Günther